Holcosus quadrilineatus, also known commonly as the four-lined ameiva and the four-lined  whiptail, is a species of lizard in the family Teiidae. The species is endemic to Central America.

Geographic range
H. quadrilineatus is found  in western Panama, Costa Rica, and southeastern Nicaragua.

Description
H. quadrilineatus is brown-coloured, with four light lines running down the back. Juveniles have metallic-blue tails.

Habitat
H. quadrilineatus lives in open habitats.

References

External links
Ameiva quadrilineata, WildHerps.net
Ameiva quadrilineata, Earthlink.com
Ameiva quadrilineata, JD's Herp Page

quadrilineatus
Taxa named by Edward Hallowell (herpetologist)
Reptiles described in 1861